Octember may refer to:

 Please Try to Remember the First of Octember! a book by Dr. Seuss, see Dr. Seuss bibliography
 The Ides of Octember the original planned name for Roger Zelazny's The Dream Master 
 Octember Variations an album by Mild Maniac Orchestra
 Octember Revolution a documentary by Kevin Moore